The  is a Japanese geographical term.  It means both an ancient division of the country and the main road running through it.  It is part of the Gokishichidō system.

The term also refers to a series of roads that connected the capitals (国府 kokufu) of each of the provinces that made up the region. The fifteen ancient provinces of the region include the following:

Iga Province
Ise Province
Shima Province
Owari Province
Mikawa Province
Tōtōmi Province
Suruga Province
Kai Province
Izu Province
Sagami Province
Musashi Province
Awa Province
Kazusa Province
Shimōsa Province
Hitachi Province

In the early Meiji period, this region's eastern route was the one chosen for stringing the telegraph lines which connected the old capital city of Kyoto with the new "eastern capital" at Tokyo.

In the modern, post-Pacific War period, all measures show the Tōkaidō region increasing in its dominance as the primary center of population and employment.

See also
 Comparison of past and present administrative divisions of Japan

Notes

References
 Nussbaum, Louis-Frédéric and Käthe Roth. (2005).  Japan encyclopedia. Cambridge: Harvard University Press. ;  OCLC 58053128
 Smith, Mary C. (1897).  "On the Tokaido," in     Life in Asia.  The World and Its People (Dunton Larkin, ed.), Vol. VI. Boston: Silver, Burdett & Company. OCLC 6747545   
 Sorensen, André. (2002). The Making of Urban Japan: cities and Planning from Edo to the Twenty-first Century. London: Routledge. ;  OCLC 48517502
 Titsingh, Isaac. (1834).  Annales des empereurs du Japon (Nihon Odai Ichiran). Paris: Royal Asiatic Society, Oriental Translation Fund of Great Britain and Ireland. OCLC 5850691

Regions of Japan